Charles Mariano Robinson (born February 2, 1984) is a music video and commercial director, and musician. Robinson is known for shooting videos for artists such as Waka Flocka, Young Buck, and Shawty Lo.

Early life
Robinson attended Greenbelt Middle School in Greenbelt, Maryland and attended Fairmont Heights High School (Maryland) in Capitol Heights, Maryland.

Films
MoneyMakers (2010) – Co-Director, Director of Photography, editor
Masterminds (2013) – Cameraman
Too Much Sugar for a Dime, The Milwaukee Story, (2020) Writer, Co-Director and Co-Producer. Executive Producer Paystack, Co-Producer Britney Winters, In Collaboration with Many Others, Avenue Q Designs, et al. {See Trailer}

Videography

Music videos

2018

Rich Homie Quan feat. Yung Mieo - Too Many

2017

Meezy feat MJG - Gangsta Walkin
L Roy Da Boy feat Starlito - Thinkin
Paystack feat MJG - Sky Is The Limit
Paystack feat Lil Boosie - Backstabbers
Yung Mieo - Too Young For Love
Stepp Stewart - Miracle (Stage Play/Music Video Musical)   
Starlito - Good Cop Bad Cop
Starlito - Yeah 5X

2016
Miss Morgan Myles - Wont Go Home
Tommy Gunn - Blood on the Money (Extended Music Video/Movie)
Ralo - Did It All
YFN Lucci - Sick and Tired
Silentó feat. Yung Mieo - Girlfriend
Starlito - Theories
Starlito feat. Dee-1 - Bad Combination
Jason Little - Heartbreak
Quan Mazzi - U Aint Right
Kid Charis - My God Over Everything
The Daily Howl - Be My Beyonce
Tippa Gutta feat. Velisosa - Tha Streets

2015
Starlito feat. Yo Gotti and Don Trip - No RearView II
Starlito feat. Troy Money - Another 1
Bezzeled Gang feat. RIO - Pu$$Y on Fleek
Young Buck feat EazyBlvd - Neva Had A Job
Troy Money feat. Starlito - 2k15
Starlito feat. Lil E - Coming From Where Im From
Big V, Nappy Roots feat. EazyBlvd - I Aint Gotta Tell Ya 
Starlito feat. Wilx - Mo Betta
CookUpBos - Active

2014
Rich Homie Quan feat. Columbia BT - She Crazy - prod by Zillasuper
Starlito feat. Don Trip - No RearView 
Starlito - Insomnia Addict
Shawty Lo - Federal Nightmares
Young Dolph - Double Up
Kevin Gates, Starlito and Don Trip – Leash on Life
B.o.B - StadiumATL 
Starlito - Eyes Closed

2013
DJ Paul feat. Yelawolf – Go Hard
Shawty Lo – This Aint New To Me
Young Breed of Triple C's feat. Bezzeled Gang – Day Off
Starlito and Don Trip – Leash on Life
Starlito and Don Trip – 28th Song
Starlito and Don Trip – Shut Up
Starlito and Don Trip – Paper Rock Scissors
Maal The Pimp – Crying Out Tears
Lyric October – Clap For Em
Tqu The Hurricane – Im Mad
Gemini Twinz – Amore Momma
Julz – S.T.U.P.I.D.
Julz – Rikers Island
oFishal – Coolin Coolin
Lroy Da Boy – Paradise
The Gemini Twinz – CKE
Bezzeled Gang – Vigorously
Suga Shane – Look at Me Now
Suga Shane – Head

2012
Lil Flip feat. Marcos Stony – Hot Summer Day
Mike Jones (rapper) feat. Marcos Stony – My Chain
Kia Shine feat. Dirty Fresh – Fly Away
Starlito and Ofishal – 8Up
Bezzeled Gang – Die Young
Young Buck feat. Bezzeled Gang – Dusted
Ofishal and Starlito – Turning Back
Bezzeled Gang feat. Starlito – Countin Money
oFishal feat. MopTop – Dukes of Hazzard
oFishal – 
Julz – Wine N Dine
Star Murphy – Anywhere
Troy Money and Starlito – Cheap Phones
Lroy Da Boy – These Rappers
Lroy Da Boy feat. A.B. – I Got a Reputation

2011
Chingo Bling feat I.V. – Mexicanos Everywhere
Star Murphy – U Send Me Swingin
B Heezy – That's Wussup
Bezzeled Gang – Loud
Bezzeled Gang – Bang
Maal The Pimp – New Chatt City
BlackCatFish – Wonderful
Bezzeled Gang – We Got It
Likwid Flowz – Suck My Swagg

2010
Young Buck feat. Young Paper – Tha City Paper Remix
Bezzeled Gang feat. Project Pat – Gettin Money
Robert Porter Da Hero – Hold My Spot
Maal The Pimp – Do You Wanna Ride
Tremo – Did It Again
Project Pat feat. Marcos Stony – Gettin Money
Marc Wayne – Southern Smoke
Gemini Twinz – Love Or Hate

2009
Young Paper – Tha City Paper
Starlito – 23-Zone
Axtion – RubberBand Money

2008
Maal The Pimp – Chattanooga

2007
Lady Dolla – 4 My Click
Ace Luv Fam – Grippin Wood Grain
Gabe Sizemore – Momma Dedication

2006
Bezzeled Gang – Get Cha Money
Eternal 3:16 – Cinderella

Short films
Starlito – Reasonable Emotions (2013)
The Bartender (2011)
Fatima...All Alone (2010) (Directed by David Keary)
Victim of Society (2010) (Directed by David Keary)

Music
"Full-Circle" Movie World Showing [Soundtrack](Album Music Only) (2007)

References

External links
 

1984 births
Living people
People from Washington, D.C.
Middle Tennessee State University alumni
People from Capitol Heights, Maryland
People from Greenbelt, Maryland
American music video directors